The hexafluoroarsenate (sometimes shortened to fluoroarsenate) anion is a chemical species with formula .  Hexafluoroarsenate is relatively inert, being the conjugate base of the notional superacid hexafluoroarsenic acid.

Synthesis 
The first undisputed synthesis is due to Otto Ruff, Kurt Stäuber and Hugo Graf, who began with the lower-valent arsenic trifluoride, using silver(I) fluoride as both a fluorine source and oxidant: AsF3 + 3AgF + NOCl -> NOAsF6 + AgCl + 2AgIn the following reaction, one mole of arsenic trifluoride, three moles of silver fluoride, and one mole of nitrosyl chloride to produce one mole of nitrosyl hexafluoroarsenate, one mole of silver chloride, and two moles of elemental silver.

Modern syntheses usually begin with arsenic pentafluoride, which abstracts fluoride from common donors, such as hydrogen fluoride or cis-difluorodiazine.  Although the hexafluoroarsenate ion is stable against hydrolysis, the related hydroxyfluoroarsenate ion is not; synthesis of hexafluoroarsenates from pentavalent arsenic oxides and  aqueous hydrogen fluoride requires thermal dehydration or extensive stoichiometric excess of the latter.

Conjugate acid and other salts
Like its pnictogen congeners, hexafluoroarsenate is a noncoordinating anion, a counterion used to stably store extremely reactive cations.  Through the appropriate choice of fluorine donor, the synthesis of hexafluoroarsenate can also double as preparation of an exotic cation.  The resulting salts are typically stable to metathesis with silver(I), ammonium, potassium, or cesium ions.  Unlike the former three, cesium hexafluoroarsenate is insoluble in water.

Hexafluoroarsenic acid is an extremely strong acid and better understood as the hydron salt of hexafluoroarsenate.  In solid form, it is isostructural with hexafluorophosphoric acid and hexafluoroantimonic acid.  Nevertheless, the  molecule cocrystallizes in solid form with certain hexafluoroarsenate salts, stabilized by a hydrogen bond.

Applications
Intercalation compounds of graphite and hexafluoroarsenic acid exhibit unusually high conductivity, leading to early proposals that the acid might serve as an electrode or electrolyte in high-energy batteries.  Subsequent investigation revealed that the high conductivity occurs because both electron holes in the graphite and the hexafluoroarsenate ions themselves serve as charge carriers.

See also
 
 Hexafluorophosphate — phosphorus analogue

References 

Superacids
Arsenic(V) compounds
Fluorine compounds